Metisella alticola is a butterfly in the family Hesperiidae. It is found in western Uganda, the eastern part of the Democratic Republic of the Congo and Rwanda.

References

Butterflies described in 1925
Heteropterinae